Arroyito may refer to:

Geography
 Arroyito, Córdoba, Argentina;
 Arroyito, Neuquén, Argentina
 Arroyito, Salta (es) in Salta, Argentina
 Barrio Arroyito, popular name of Barrio Lisandro de la Torre, Rosario, Santa Fe, Argentina;
 Arroyito (de) town in Santa Cruz Department (Bolivia)
 Arroyity, Paraguay
 Arroyito stream, (es) in Treinta y Tres Department, Uruguay.

Music
"Arroyito", song composed by Agustín Lara and sung by himself in the film Mujer en condominio (1958)
 Arroyito (song), a song by Fonseca